Megastygarctides is a genus of tardigrades, the only one in the subfamily Megastygarctidinae in the family Stygarctidae. The genus was first described and named by McKirdy, Schmidt & McGinty-Bayly in 1976. It was placed in the new subfamily Megastygarctidinae in 1998 by Bello and de Zio Grimaldi.

Species
The genus includes the following species:
 Megastygarctides christinae Hansen & Kristensen, 2006
 Megastygarctides gerdae Hansen & Kristensen, 2006
 Megastygarctides isounguis Renaud-Mornant, 1981
 Megastygarctides orbiculatus McKirdy, Schmidt & McGinty-Bayly, 1976
 Megastygarctides setoloso Morgan & O'Reilly, 1989
 Megastygarctides sezginii Ürkmez, Ostrowska, Roszkowska, Gawlak, Zawierucha, Kristensen & Kaczmarek, 2017

References

Further reading

 Bello & de Zio Grimaldi, 1998 : Phylogeny of the genera of the Stygarctidae and related families (Tardigrada: Heterotardigrada). Zoologischer Anzeiger, vol. 237, no. 2/3, p. 171-183.
 McKirdy, Schmidt & McGinty-Bayly, 1976 : Interstitielle Fauna von Galapagos. 16. Tardigrada. [Interstitial Fauna of the Galapagos 16. Tardigrada] Mikrofauna Meeresbodens, no. 58, p. 1-42.

Tardigrade genera
Stygarctidae